Darío Lopérfido (Buenos Aires, 1964) is an Argentine politician, cultural promoter and journalist who served as General and artistic director of Teatro Colón since February 2015 until his resignation in 2016.

Lopérfido was a consultant for Grupo PRISA in Madrid, Spain between 2002 and 2008. He was Argentina's Secretary of Culture and Communications between 1999 and 2001, Secretary of Culture of the Autonomous City of Buenos Aires between 1997 and 1999, and Subsecretary of Cultural Actions of Buenos Aires in 1996.

Lopérfido also directed the Ricardo Rojas Cultural Center, dependant of Universidad de Buenos Aires between 1992 and 1999, and Festival Internacional de Buenos Aires in its 1997, 1999, 2011, and 2013 editions.

He worked as a journalist specialized in arts and culture on Revista Teatro, and radio stations FM Rock & Pop and La Red between 1985 and 1989.

He wrote with co-author Alejandro Félix Capato the books Derechos Culturales en el Mercosur and Legislación Cultural en la Ciudad de Buenos Aires.

He returned to politics in 2019 as pre-candidate as Buenos Aires City Mayor with the Mejorar party but later declined.
He announced in early 2020 that he is planning to run for the next elections in 2021.

References

Living people
1964 births
Argentine journalists
Male journalists
People from Buenos Aires
People named in the Panama Papers